Manny's Orphans (also known as Kick!) is a 1978 American family comedy film directed by Sean S. Cunningham. The film was also distributed under the title Kick!.

Plot
Manny (Jim Baker) coaches soccer for the fashionable Creighton Hall school, but is relieved of duty because he is "not a good match" for the school. He finds a job at a Catholic home for orphans, where he forms a new soccer team, with the help of one very good player, Pepe, who turns out to be a girl. Pepe is the sister of one of the orphans, who comes to the all-boy orphanage posing as a boy, because her former foster home was an abusive environment.

Along the way, Manny has incurred a gambling debt, his creditors begin to lean on him, and the boys find out. They set up a soccer game and stake the outcome against Manny's debt. If they win, then the debt shall be forgiven.

Cast
 Jim Baker – Manny
 Malachy McCourt – Father Arch McCoy
 Chet Doherty – Dr. Berryman
 Sel Skolnick – Mr. Caputo
 Xavier Rodrigo – Raoul
 Melissa Valentin – Pepe
 Ari Lehman – Roger

Production
Of the film, writer Victor Miller said: "Steve Miner came up with the idea for it and I wrote the screenplay and we did it, another low-budget film [along with Here Come the Tigers], and shot it around Bridgeport, Connecticut."

Director Cunningham said: "We had this notion of a bunch of orphans in a halfway house, they put together a soccer team and the underdog wins. So we raised the money to do what became known as Manny's Orphans. It was a lot of fun to make, and again I loved working with the kids. I really thought it was going to be a breakthrough film for me." Cunningham also maintains that the reaction was "lukewarm", and although United Artists optioned it as a pilot for a TV series, they did not buy it.

References

External links

1978 films
1970s sports comedy films
American sports comedy films
American association football films
Films about orphans
Films scored by Harry Manfredini
Films directed by Sean S. Cunningham
Films shot in Connecticut
Films with screenplays by Victor Miller (writer)
1978 comedy films
1970s English-language films
1970s American films